Gregory Norman Mahle (born April 17, 1993) is an American professional baseball pitcher for the Tecolotes de los Dos Laredos of the Mexican League. He attended the University of California, Santa Barbara, where he played college baseball for the UC Santa Barbara Gauchos team.

Mahle was named a Louisville Slugger Freshman All-American after his 2012 collegiate season. The Angels selected him with the 449 pick in the 2014 Major League Baseball draft.

Amateur career

High school
Mahle attended Westminster High School in Westminster, California. Playing for the school's varsity baseball for his last three years of high school as a two-way player, on varsity he recorded a .372 batting average, 73 hits and 3 career home runs, while winning 13 games on the mound, recording a 1.21 earned run average and 122 career strikeouts.

College career
As a freshman at UC Santa Barbara in 2012, Mahle pitched  innings for a 3–4 win–loss record and a 3.88 earned run average (ERA). At the plate, Mahle recorded a .347 batting average with 66 total hits, which helped him earn a spot on the Louisville Slugger Freshman All-American Team along with 2nd Team All Big West.

As a Sophomore in 2013, he pitched 61 innings recording a 7–5 record with two saves and a 4.28 ERA, helping the UC Santa Barbara Gauchos get to a regional for the first time since 2001.

As a Junior in 2014, Mahle pitched 70 innings earning a 6–5 win–loss record with one save and a 2.70 ERA. As a hitter, he recorded a .345 batting average while suffering only two strikeouts the entire season.

Professional career

Los Angeles Angels
Mahle was drafted in the 15th round, with the 449th pick, of the 2014 Major League Baseball draft. Shortly after signing, he began his professional career with the Orem Owlz of the Rookie Pioneer League where he did not allow a run in eight innings. Mahle was then promoted to the Burlington Bees which are in the Class-A(Low-A) Midwest League, where he recorded a 3.38 ERA while allowing only 20 hits in 20 innings pitched.

On April 11, 2016, Mahle was selected to the 40-man and active rosters. On April 13, Mahle made his MLB debut, pitching 1.0 scoreless inning with 1 strikeout against the Oakland Athletics. In 24 games for the Angels, Mahle recorded a 5.40 ERA with 14 strikeouts. On April 29, 2017, Mahle was designated for assignment by the Angels after allowing 11 runs in 18.1 innings of work. He was outrighted to AAA on May 3, 2017.

He split the rest of 2017 between the Double-A Mobile BayBears and Triple-A Salt Lake Bees, pitching to a cumulative 10–4 record and 4.77 ERA. In 2018, Mahle again split the year between Mobile and Salt Lake, recording a 6–4 record and 4.67 ERA in 43 games. In 2019, Mahle yet again split the season between Mobile and Salt Lake, registering a 4–7 record and 4.41 ERA in 87.2 innings of work. On October 15, 2019, Mahle was released by the Angels.

Sugar Land Lightning Sloths
On December 19, 2019, Mahle signed with the Toros de Tijuana of the Mexican League for the 2020 season. However, the season was later canceled due to the COVID-19 pandemic and he became a free agent.

In July 2020, Mahle signed on to play for the Sugar Land Lightning Sloths of the Constellation Energy League (a makeshift 4-team independent league created as a result of the COVID-19 pandemic) for the 2020 season.

Tecolotes de los Dos Laredos
On February 12, 2021, Mahle was traded to the Tecolotes de los Dos Laredos of the Mexican League.

Personal
Mahle's brother Tyler Mahle, plays for the Minnesota Twins.

References

External links

1993 births
Living people
People from Westminster, California
Baseball players from California
Major League Baseball pitchers
American expatriate baseball players in Mexico
Los Angeles Angels players
UC Santa Barbara Gauchos baseball players
Orem Owlz players
Burlington Bees players
Inland Empire 66ers of San Bernardino players
Arkansas Travelers players
Mesa Solar Sox players
Mobile BayBears players
Salt Lake Bees players
Águilas de Mexicali players
Tecolotes de los Dos Laredos players